Francisco "Kiko" Ramírez González (born 14 July 1970) is a Spanish professional football manager and former player who played as a forward. He currently serves as the sporting director of Polish club Wisła Kraków.

Playing career
Born in Tarragona, Catalonia, Ramírez never competed in higher than Segunda División B. He began his career with Gimnàstic de Tarragona in 1989, but never managed to establish himself as a regular starter, only featuring more regularly after a loan to CFJ Mollerussa; his best input came in the 1993–94 season, where he scored 12 goals in 33 matches.

Ramírez subsequently represented CE Sabadell FC, Málaga CF, AD Ceuta, Cartagonova CF, Novelda CF and UE Tàrrega, retiring with the latter side in 2002 at the age of 32. He scored a career-best 18 goals in the 1996–97 campaign while at Sabadell, and achieved his only promotion with Málaga the following year.

Coaching career
Ramírez took up coaching after retiring, acting as assistant at his first club Gimnàstic until 2007. In May 2010, after three years in charge of the Juvenil squad, he was appointed manager of the farm team, CF Pobla de Mafumet from Tercera División.

On 23 June 2012, Ramírez took the reins of the first team, recently relegated from Segunda División. He was sacked on 14 October, after only one win in eight matches.

In October 2013, Ramírez was named CE L'Hospitalet manager. He finished his first season as second, but missed out on promotion in the play-offs.

Ramírez renewed with Hospi on 27 June 2014, but left the club the following 10 May after finishing out of the play-off places. On 20 October 2015, he took charge of CD Castellón in the fourth division. He led them to a third-place finish in the regular season, but fell short in the play-offs to CF Gavà, on penalties, thus resigning on 3 July 2016.

On 3 January 2017, Ramírez moved abroad for the first time in his career, after being named manager of Polish Ekstraklasa side Wisła Kraków. He was replaced on 11 December that year by compatriot Joan Carrillo.

Ramírez returned to his native region in January 2019, taking over at his former club Sabadell. He was dismissed on 2 April, having taken seven points from 11 games and with the team in the relegation zone to the fourth tier.

In the following years, Ramírez worked in the Super League Greece and the Indian Super League. He was relieved of his duties at Odisha FC on 14 January 2022, after just two wins in the last seven matches.

Ramírez returned to Poland and Wisła on 5 December 2022, taking on the role of sporting director until the end of the season 2022/2023.

Managerial statistics

References

External links

1970 births
Living people
Sportspeople from Tarragona
Spanish footballers
Footballers from Catalonia
Association football forwards
Segunda División B players
Tercera División players
Gimnàstic de Tarragona footballers
CE Sabadell FC footballers
Málaga CF players
AD Ceuta footballers
FC Cartagena footballers
Novelda CF players
UE Tàrrega players
Spanish football managers
Segunda División B managers
Tercera División managers
CF Pobla de Mafumet managers
Gimnàstic de Tarragona managers
CE L'Hospitalet managers
CD Castellón managers
CE Sabadell FC managers
Ekstraklasa managers
Wisła Kraków managers
Super League Greece managers
Xanthi F.C. managers
Indian Super League head coaches
Odisha FC head coaches
Spanish expatriate football managers
Expatriate football managers in Poland
Expatriate football managers in Greece
Expatriate football managers in India
Spanish expatriate sportspeople in Poland
Spanish expatriate sportspeople in Greece
Spanish expatriate sportspeople in India